In political science, a  constitutional crisis is a problem or conflict in the function of a government that the political constitution or other fundamental governing law is perceived to be unable to resolve. There are several variations to this definition. For instance, one describes it as the crisis that arises out of the failure, or at least a strong risk of failure, of a constitution to perform its central functions. The crisis may arise from a variety of possible causes. For example, a government may want to pass a law contrary to its constitution; the constitution may fail to provide a clear answer for a specific situation; the constitution may be clear but it may be politically infeasible to follow it; the government institutions themselves may falter or fail to live up to what the law prescribes them to be; or officials in the government may justify avoiding dealing with a serious problem based on narrow interpretations of the law. Specific examples include the South African Coloured vote constitutional crisis in the 1950s, the secession of the southern U.S. states in 1860 and 1861, the dismissal of the Australian federal government in 1975 and the 2007 Ukrainian crisis. While the United Kingdom of Great Britain and Northern Ireland does not have a written constitution, it is deemed to have an unwritten one, and issues and crises in the UK and its constituent countries are described as constitutional crises.

Constitutional crises may arise from conflicts between different branches of government, conflicts between central and local governments, or simply conflicts among various factions within society. In the course of government, the crisis results when one or more of the parties to a political dispute willfully chooses to violate a law of the constitution; or to flout an unwritten constitutional convention; or to dispute the correct, legal interpretation of the violated constitutional law or of the flouted political custom. This was demonstrated by the so-called XYZ Affair, which involved the bribery of French officials by a contingent of American commissioners who were sent to preserve peace between France and the United States. The incident was published in the American press and created a foreign policy crisis, which precipitated the passage of the Alien and Sedition Acts. Opposition to these acts in the form of the Virginia and Kentucky Resolutions cited that they violated freedom of speech and exhorted states to refuse their enforcement since they violated the Constitution.

When the crisis arises because the constitution is legally ambiguous, the ultimate resolution usually establishes the legal precedent to resolve future crises of constitutional administration. Such was the case in the United States presidential succession of John Tyler, which established that a successor to the presidency assumes the office without any limitation. Politically, a constitutional crisis can lead to administrative paralysis and eventual collapse of the government, the loss of political legitimacy, or to civil war. A constitutional crisis is distinct from a rebellion, which occurs when political factions outside a government challenge the government's sovereignty, as in a coup d'état or a revolution led by the military or by civilians.

Africa

Democratic Republic of the Congo

The Congo Crisis. President Joseph Kasavubu and Prime Minister Patrice Lumumba attempted to dismiss each other in September 1960. General Mobutu Sese Seko deposed both in a coup later that month, then restored Kasavubu as president.

Egypt
Egypt experienced a constitutional crisis when President Hosni Mubarak was removed in the Egyptian Revolution. The country was left without a president until President Mohamed Morsi was elected and then again when Morsi was arrested by the Egyptian Armed Forces in a 2013 coup d'etat until President Abdel Fattah el-Sisi took office.

Malawi
 A constitutional crisis occurred in Malawi in 2012 with regard to the succession of Bingu wa Mutharika. The President and Vice-President were from different parties which led to deliberations over who the rightful successor would be and the constitutional crisis. Vice-President Joyce Banda eventually succeeded wa Mutharika.

Gambia
 Following the victory of Adama Barrow in the 2016 presidential election, president Yahya Jammeh rejected the results and refused to step down. On 17 January, Jammeh declared a 90-day state of emergency in an attempt to extend his term of office. Senegalese, Ghanaian and Nigerian forces entered the Gambia on 19 January to enforce the election results. On 21 January, Jammeh stepped down and left the country.

Rhodesia
 Amid demands from British politicians to enfranchise the black majority population as a condition for independence, the white minority government of Ian Smith unilaterally declared independence in 1965. The UK rejected the declaration and continued to claim sovereignty over Rhodesia until a framework for independence and black enfranchisement was negotiated in the 1979 Lancaster House Agreement.

South Africa
 The Coloured vote constitutional crisis (1951–55): The National Party government disputed a Supreme Court decision overturning its Separate Representation of Voters Act to disenfranchise Coloured voters in the Cape Province. Its attempt to reverse the decision in an ad hoc court was also overturned, after which the party used reforms to the Senate to pass the measure legally.

Asia

Iran
Mohammed Reza Pahlavi's 1953 dismissal of Prime Minister Mohammed Mossadegh and Mossadegh's subsequent refusal to quit the office, leading to the 1953 Iranian coup d'état.

Malaysia
 1966 Sarawak constitutional crisis started by a group of politicians who were dissatisfied towards Stephen Kalong Ningkan's leadership as chief minister. Ningkan was later removed from the chief minister post by the Governor of Sarawak in June 1966.
 The 1983 Malaysian constitutional crisis saw Prime Minister Mahathir pushing forward an amendment of Article 66 of the Federal Constitution, which set the time limit of the Malaysian monarch to veto a law within 30 days. The proposals generated a great deal of controversy between the government and the monarchy, of which the former had to launch a public campaign to pressure the monarchy to assent to the amendments.
 The 1988 Malaysian constitutional crisis was a series of events that began with the United Malays National Organisation (UMNO) party elections in 1987 and ended with the suspension and the eventual removal of Lord President of the Supreme Court Tun Salleh Abas from his seat.
 The 1993 amendments to the Constitution of Malaysia (by some interpretations a constitutional crisis) involved the limitation of monarchs' legal immunity in Malaysia. Prime Minister Mahathir bin Mohamad successfully amended the constitution to make the monarchies more accountable to their actions.
The 2009 Perak constitutional crisis occurred in the Malaysian state of Perak when party defections caused the state ruling coalition, Pakatan Rakyat, to lose its majority in the state assembly. The Sultan of Perak refused to dissolve the state assembly when requested and dismissed the Menteri Besar (Chief Minister) in the absence of a no confidence vote.
 The 2020 Malaysian constitutional crisis was a series of events that began when Prime Minister Mahathir Mohamad and associates attempted to replace his coalition partners and form a unity government supported by opposition parties.

Pakistan
Supreme Court Chief Justice Sajjad Ali Shah clashed repeatedly with Prime Minister Nawaz Sharif in late 1997, accusing him of undermining the court's independence. After Ali Shah suspended a constitutional amendment that prevented dismissal of the prime minister, Sharif ordered President Farooq Leghari to appoint a new chief justice. When Leghari refused, Sharif considered impeaching him, but backed down after a warning from the armed forces. Faced with a choice of accepting Sharif's demands or dismissing him, Leghari resigned. Ali Shah resigned shortly afterward, establishing Sharif's dominance.
Following a no-confidence motion against Prime Minister Imran Khan on 8 March 2022, a constitutional crisis occurred when the deputy speaker of the National Assembly rejected the no-confidence motion on the 3rd of April 2022. President Arif Alvi subsequently dissolved the national assembly, upon advice from the Prime Minister, which constitutionally could not be done by a Prime Minister who is facing a no-confidence motion.

Thailand
The 2005–2006 Thai political crisis. In March 2006, 60 seats of the National Assembly of Thailand could not be elected, and Prime Minister Thaksin Shinawatra refused to resign. The judicial system did not lead up to Supreme Court as the top arbitrator so there were inconsistent rulings from the civil, criminal, administrative, and constitutional Courts.
The 2008 Thai political crisis.

Sri Lanka

On the 26th of October 2018, President Maithripala Sirisena appointed former President Mahinda Rajapaksa as Prime Minister and dismissed incumbent Prime Minister Ranil Wickremesinghe. Ranil Wickremesing refused to accept the dismissal while stating that it was unconstitutional and undemocratic.

Europe

Austria 

 The self-elimination of the Austrian Parliament in 1933, when all three speakers of the National Council resigned. Engelbert Dollfuss stated the parliament had eliminated itself and could rule by decree. This was a step towards the one-party fascist state, the Federal State of Austria.

Belgium
The Royal Question over the status of king Leopold III began when he acted against ministerial advice during the 1940 Nazi invasion and refused to join the government in exile. Deported to Germany before Belgium's 1944 liberation, Leopold's return was narrowly approved in a 1950 referendum but a subsequent general strike prompted him to abdicate the following year.
In 1990, King Baudouin refused routine Royal Assent to the law on abortion in Belgium.  The issue was resolved by (constitutionally but controversially) having Baudouin temporarily declared incapable of reigning, the Council of Ministers giving assent as provided for in the Belgian Constitution, and Baudouin declared capable again.

Denmark
The Easter Crisis of 1920, when King Christian X of Denmark dismissed the country's cabinet.

England

The 1215 Barons' revolt against the rule of King John, which led to the Magna Carta. Immediately, John repudiated Magna Carta, leading to the First Barons' War.
The English Reformation: Pope Clement VII's refusal to annul King Henry VIII's first marriage with Catherine of Aragon impeded the king's efforts to produce a male heir. Henry repudiated the Pope's ecclesiastical authority within England and required all officials to recognize him as Supreme Head of the Church of England, allowing him to divorce Catherine and marry Anne Boleyn.
King Charles I's insistence on the Divine Right of Kings, manifest in his Personal Rule from 1629 to 1640, and leading directly to the Wars of the Three Kingdoms.
The Glorious Revolution of 1688–89: The flight of King James II/VII from the country left no king in his place to rule England or Scotland or to summon a Parliament.  When King William and Queen Mary jointly replaced him there was therefore no legally recognised Parliament to legitimise their irregular succession to the throne. This led to the Crown and Parliament Recognition Act 1689.

Estonia
The early 1930s political crisis in Estonia as two constitutional reforms had been rejected by the electorate and only the third referendum in 1933 succeeded in replacing the parliamentary republic with the presidential republic. The succeeding constitutional reform was proposed by the Vaps Movement, who were however kept from power by the self-coup of Prime Minister Konstantin Päts, who was supported by the Riigikogu.

France
The Brittany Affair of 1765: The king's court in Brittany forbade collection of taxes to which the provincial Estates did not consent. After King Louis XV annulled the court's decree, most of its members resigned. The chief prosecutor, Louis-René de Caradeuc de La Chalotais, was accused of writing letters denouncing the king's action and charged with treason. A court convened to try La Chalotais reached no conclusion due to questions of jurisdiction and the weakness of the evidence. The king then transferred the case to his own council, further inflaming fears of absolutism to the point that he was obligated to release La Chalotais and yield to the provincial authorities.
The 16 May 1877 crisis: President Patrice de Mac-Mahon dismissed Prime Minister Jules Simon and named Albert de Broglie to replace him. The National Assembly refused to recognize the new government and a crisis, which ended with the dissolution of the Assembly and new elections, ensued.

Germany
 In the Weimar Republic, for several years the country was governed with the help of enabling acts and emergency decrees. The crisis became dramatic in 1932, when the Nazi Party and Communist Party of Germany had together a majority in the Reichstag. Any government, installed by the Reich President, was likely to be dismissed by the parliament. The crisis ended in a Nazi and conservative coalition government and then Nazi dictatorship. The Weimar Constitution was not abolished, but weakened to the point of irrelevance.
 In 1962 Spiegel affair, Franz Josef Strauss, Federal Minister of Defense, tried to repress media freedom with governmental resources and accused Der Spiegel employees of treason after an article exposed the Fibag scandal. In 1966, Federal Constitutional Court of Germany issued a groundbreaking ruling concerning freedom of the press. The incident caused the first mass demonstrations and public protests and helped Germany remove many authoritarian features still retained following the end of World War II, marking a turning point in Germany values as ordinary people rejected authoritarian outlook in favor of democratic values.

Malta
 The 1981 election, when, due to a quirk in that country's Single Transferable Vote system, the party winning more than half the votes won fewer than half the seats in parliament.

Order of Malta
 In December 2016 Matthew Festing, Grand Master of the Order of Malta, dismissed its Grand Chancellor Albrecht von Boeselager for allowing the distribution of contraceptives in violation of the Catholic Church's policy. Boeslanger protested that the dismissal was irregular under the Order's constitution and appealed to Pope Francis. Francis ordered an investigation of the dispute, then demanded and received Festing's resignation. The Order elected Giacomo dalla Torre del Tempio di Sanguinetto as Festing's successor on a program of constitutional reform and promoting religious obedience.

Norway
Impeachment of prime minister Christian August Selmer's cabinet in 1883/1884 regarding the king's right to veto changes to the constitution, and establishment of an ad-hoc parliamentary practice until amended to the constitution in 2007.
Dissolution of the union between Norway and Sweden in 1905

Roman Empire
 Caesar's Civil War: In 50 BC the Roman Senate ordered Julius Caesar, a popular military general and territorial governor, to disband his army and return to Rome after he invaded Gaul and Britain. Rather than comply, Caesar crossed the boundary of his territory with a legion of his army intending to confront the government. The Senate retreated before his advance, allowing him to establish a dictatorship that set the template for the Roman Empire.

Russia
The constitutional crisis of 1993: a conflict between Russian President Boris Yeltsin and the Russian Supreme Soviet led by Ruslan Khasbulatov. It emerged due to disagreements regarding the demarcation of political authority. Russian leaders agreed to hold a referendum in April 1993 that would determine whether the presidency or the parliament would be the dominant institution in the Russian political system. The parliament temporarily reneged on its commitment to a referendum and it prompted Yeltsin to issue a decree giving the president more authority. This was met with resistance even from among figures within the executive department such as Yurii Shokov, chair of the president's Security Council and Aleksandr Rutskoy, Yeltsin's Vice President. Anticipating impeachment, Yeltsin dissolved the parliament on September 21, 1993 and called for fresh elections. The president did not have the constitutional authority to do this and the Constitutional Court promptly ruled that the decree was unconstitutional. This resulted to ten days of street fighting between the police, pro-parliamentary demonstrators, and groups loyal to the president. Aleksandr Rutskoy was sworn as the acting President of Russia for a few days. The crisis ended after a military siege of the Russian White House, which claimed 187 lives.

Scotland
This covers the Kingdom of Scotland, which became part of the Kingdom of Great Britain after 1707. For constitutional crises since then, see United Kingdom below.
 The death of three-year-old Queen Margaret in 1290 prompted a succession dispute involving thirteen claimants. The interim Guardians of Scotland asked King Edward I of England to arbitrate the dispute. Edward pursued his own interest in establishing lordship over Scotland by selecting claimant John Balliol in return for an oath of fealty. Scottish nobles rejected Edward's control, leading to the Wars of Scottish Independence and a 10-year vacancy of the throne.

Spain

The 2017–18 Spanish constitutional crisis saw the Government of Spain and the Generalitat of Catalonia clashing over the latter's planning of an independence referendum on 1 October 2017, leading to the Catalan government openly defying instructions from the Spanish Constitutional Court and in state prosecutors filling criminal charges on Catalan leading officials for rebellion, disobedience, misusing public funds and making deliberately unlawful decisions. General strikes and tense demonstrations took place during these weeks. On 27 October, the Parliament of Catalonia tried to found a Catalan republic with a unilateral declaration of independence. At the same time, the Senate approved the application of Article 155 of the Constitution, which led to the cessation of the Catalan Government, the dissolution of parliament, the call for elections for 21 December and the direct rule over Catalonia. The Supreme Court imprisoned a large part of the Puigdemont executive, the Speaker of the Parliament and the two leaders of the two major independentists civil associations, as well as the flight to Belgium, Switzerland, Germany and Scotland of President Puigdemont, four regional ex-regional ministers and two political leaders. For July 2018, the direct rule ended and the prisoners are still in preventive jail in Catalan prisons.

Ukraine

 The 2020-2021 Ukrainian constitutional crisis started when the Constitutional Court of Ukraine ruled much of Ukraine's 2014 anti-corruption reform to be unconstitutional. Following the decision, President Volodymyr Zelenskyy warned that if parliament did not restore these anti-corruption laws, foreign aid, loans and a visa-free travel to the European Union were at risk. Governor Kyrylo Shevchenko of the National Bank of Ukraine reported that Ukraine will not receive the scheduled $700 million IMF load before the end of 2020 because of the issue. IMF assessment teams had not visited Ukraine for eight months, which is necessary for further IMF loan tranches to be released. The European Union (EU) issued a statement that the court’s decision called “into question a number of international commitments which Ukraine assumed in relation to its international partners, including the EU.” Following the start of the crisis, the Verkhovna Rada re-enacted some of the quashed legislation, while President Volodymyr Zelenskyy repeatedly attempted to suspend the Court's President Oleksandr Tupytskyi and to remove some of the judges from the Court by decree; all these decrees were ruled as unconstitutional by the Court itself.

United Kingdom
While the United Kingdom of Great Britain and Northern Ireland does not have a written constitution, it is deemed to have an unwritten one, and issues and crises in the UK and its constituent countries are described as constitutional crises.
The regency crisis of 1788: A new Parliament convened while King George III was unable, due to illness, to charge it with its responsibilities or assent to any bills. Parliament nonetheless submitted an irregular bill that provided for George, Prince of Wales, to act as regent, and the Lord Chancellor Lord Thurlow affixed the royal seal to it without the king's signature. This precedent was repeated in 1811 after the king again fell ill.
The House of Lords's rejection of the 1909 People's Budget, a proposal by Chancellor of the Exchequer David Lloyd George and President of the Board of Trade Winston Churchill entailing welfare reforms funded by taxes on landowners. This caused a two-year impasse, which ended after the Liberal Party won the January 1910 general election and the House of Lords ratified the law. However, the impasse resumed when Prime Minister H. H. Asquith introduced the Parliament Act permanently removing the House of Lord's veto over money bills and sharply limiting its veto over public bills, which the House of Lords blocked after the December 1910 general election ended in a hung parliament. King George V finally forced the House to ratify the law by threatening to end its Conservative majority by appointing hundreds of new peerages.
The 1936 Edward VIII abdication crisis, when King Edward VIII proposed to marry divorcee Wallis Simpson against the advice of his ministers. This was unacceptable to the leaders of the United Kingdom and the Dominions because Simpson was twice divorced and the Church of England, of which Edward nominally served as the head, forbade remarriage of divorcees if their spouses were still alive. Rather than ending their relationship the King chose to abdicate and his brother assumed the throne as King George VI.  
The 2019 British prorogation controversy in October 2019, where the Government of Conservative Prime Minister Boris Johnson advised Queen Elizabeth II to prorogue the British Parliament for five weeks. The decision was taken during contentious parliamentary debate over the United Kingdom's impending withdrawal from the European Union.  In the unanimous R (Miller) v The Prime Minister and Cherry v Advocate General for Scotland decisions, the Supreme Court of the United Kingdom unanimously found the prorogation to be illegal as preventing the ability of Parliament to carry out its constitutional functions without reasonable justification.

North America

Canada
 In the King–Byng Affair of 1926, Governor General the Viscount Byng of Vimy refused the request of his Prime Minister, William Lyon Mackenzie King, to dissolve Parliament and call new elections after King had, months before, refused to resign. Instead, Byng dismissed King and appointed Arthur Meighen as Prime Minister, after which Meighen found himself unable to obtain the confidence of the House of Commons, triggering his own resignation and the 1926 federal election. Reaction to the affair was reflected in the Balfour Declaration of 1926, the resulting separation of dominion governors-general from the British government, and the Statute of Westminster, 1931, that made each realm of the Crown independent.
 The 1936 abdication crisis, when King Edward VIII proposed to marry divorcee Wallis Simpson against the advice of his ministers.
 The 1982 patriation of the constitution was contentious, as there were conflicting opinions from the federal government, provincial governments, and Supreme Court over what exactly the procedure was for Canada to request a constitutional amendment from the Parliament of the United Kingdom. The Supreme Court's decision in the Quebec Veto Reference found that Quebec did not have a veto on patriation and the process for amendment used was legitimate and binding. The National Assembly of Quebec symbolically refuses to ratify the Constitution Act, 1982, in its current form.
 The 2008–2009 Canadian parliamentary dispute, in which Liberal, New Democratic, and Bloc Québécois members of Parliament attempted to vote non-confidence against the Conservative ministry and replace it with a coalition government, was unprecedented in the Canadian constitutional system. Prime Minister Stephen Harper controversially advised Governor General Michaëlle Jean to prorogue Parliament to avoid the vote. The coalition effort subsequently fell apart, leaving the key questions around the dispute unanswered.

Honduras
The 2009 Honduran constitutional crisis saw President Manuel Zelaya attempting to hold a non-binding referendum which Congress and the Supreme Court deemed unconstitutional. The Honduran Armed Forces, following orders from the Supreme Court, arrested President Zelaya.

United States

The Nullification Crisis of 1832, in which South Carolina declared that it would not permit collection of the federally ratified Tariffs of 1828 and 1832.  It based its resistance on the legal theory of nullification, which held that the U.S. Constitution was a voluntary compact between states and that they therefore have the right of interposition against federal law they deem unconstitutional. The United States Congress eventually passed the Force Bill to authorize President Andrew Jackson to use military force in South Carolina to enforce federal laws, as well as a revised tariff law with lower rates.
In 1841 presidential duties passed to Vice President John Tyler upon the death of President William Henry Harrison. The Constitution was unclear as to whether Tyler should assume the office of President or merely execute the duties of the vacant office. Tyler insisted that politicians recognize him as President and returned, unopened, all mail addressed to the "Vice President" or "Acting President." Despite opposition from some Whig members of Congress, including John Quincy Adams and Henry Clay, both houses passed a resolution confirming Tyler's position. This precedent would govern presidential succession until it was codified in the Twenty-fifth Amendment.
After the Democratic Party fractured into sectional factions the Republican nominee Abraham Lincoln won the 1860 presidential election with 40 percent of the nationwide vote but with almost no votes from the South, in some states not even appearing on the ballot. Eleven southern slave states who feared Lincoln would outlaw slavery in the Western territories responded by seceding from the Union and forming the Confederate States of America. The federal government refused to recognize the secession and the American Civil War began after Confederate forces fired on and captured Fort Sumter in Charleston, South Carolina. The war, which would be the deadliest military conflict in American history, ended after four years with the complete collapse of the Confederacy and the reincorporation of the states back into the Union under Reconstruction. 
1876 presidential election: Republicans and Democrats disputed voting results in three states. An ad hoc Electoral Commission, created by Congress, voted along party lines in favor of Republican candidate Rutherford B. Hayes, in exchange for withdrawing federal troops from the South and ending Reconstruction.
The 1952 steel strike: President Harry S. Truman nationalized the country's steel industry on the basis of his inherent powers in order to prevent a strike by the United Steelworkers that would impede the Korean War. This action reopened the "Great Debate" of 1950–51 regarding the extent of Truman's authority to counter the spread of communism. The Supreme Court annulled Truman's order in Youngstown Sheet & Tube Co. v. Sawyer, holding that presidential actions must proceed from constitutional or legislative authority. Truman used the threat of a second nationalization to push steel workers and management to an agreement.
In the Watergate scandal (1972–1974), President Richard Nixon and his staff obstructed investigations into their political activities. Nixon resigned, under threat of impeachment, after the release of an audio tape showing that he had personally approved the obstruction. Congressional moves to restrain presidential authority continued for years afterward.

Oceania

Australia
The 1936 Edward VIII abdication crisis, when King Edward VIII proposed to marry divorcee Wallis Simpson against the advice of his ministers.
The 1975 Australian constitutional crisis saw the Prime Minister Gough Whitlam and his government dismissed by the nation's Governor-General Sir John Kerr, in response to a prolonged budget deadlock in Parliament. Whitlam's Labor government had the confidence of the lower house, the House of Representatives. In the Australian Constitution, the Senate has equal powers with the House of Representatives, except it may not initiate or amend a supply bill. It can, however, reject or defer consideration of such a bill, and that is what it did on this occasion. The Constitution permits the Governor-General to dismiss the government if they cannot command the confidence of Parliament and will not call an election. Though the government lacked the confidence of the Senate, they commanded the confidence of the lower house, where government is formed and confidence motions introduced. Whitlam also stated his intention to call an election, but Kerr nonetheless dismissed him without prior warning and installed Malcolm Fraser as Prime Minister, despite Fraser's inability to command the confidence of either house of Parliament. After Fraser's Liberal government passed several important appropriations bills Kerr declared a double dissolution of Parliament and the 1975 federal election, which Fraser won in a landslide. 
In 2017, the eligibility of a number of Australian parliamentarians to sit in the Parliament of Australia was called into question because of their actual or possible dual citizenship. The issue arises from section 44 of the Constitution of Australia, which prohibits members of either house of the Parliament from having allegiance to a foreign power. Several MPs resigned in anticipation of being ruled ineligible, and five more were forced to resign after being ruled ineligible by the High Court of Australia, including National Party leader and Deputy Prime Minister Barnaby Joyce. This became an ongoing political event referred to variously as a "constitutional crisis" or the "citizenship crisis".

Fiji
In the Fiji constitutional crisis of 1977, the winning party in a general election failed to name a government due to internal conflicts. The Governor-General intervened, appointing a prime minister from the opposition party.

Kiribati

New Zealand
The 1936 Edward VIII abdication crisis, when King Edward VIII proposed to marry divorcee Wallis Simpson against the advice of his ministers.
The New Zealand constitutional crisis of 1984 was caused by Prime Minister Sir Rob Muldoon's refusal to devalue the New Zealand dollar as per the instructions of the Prime Minister-elect, David Lange.  The outgoing cabinet rebelled against Muldoon, who relented. The crisis led to the passage of the Constitution Act, which patriated the constitution from the United Kingdom.

Papua New Guinea
The Papua New Guinean constitutional crisis of 2011–2012 was caused by a disagreement, involving every branch of government including the Supreme Court, as to who the legitimate Prime Minister was. Specifically, whether Prime Minister Michael Somare's dismissal by the Speaker of the National Parliament while he was in hospital had been lawful. After ten months, the crisis was resolved peacefully by a general election.

Samoa 

 The April 2021 Samoan general election resulted in legal challenges and a crisis.

Tuvalu
The Tuvaluan constitutional crisis of 2013 occurred when Prime Minister Willy Telavi sought to continue governing after having lost his parliamentary majority. He deferred allowing Parliament to sit, and his ally Speaker Kamuta Latasi did not allow a motion of no confidence to be tabled when it finally did sit. The Opposition accused the government of acting unconstitutionally, and Governor General Sir Iakoba Italeli intervened, removing the Prime Minister from office so that Parliament could decide who should form the government. Telavi sought in vain to ask the Queen of Tuvalu, Elizabeth II, to remove the Governor General. Parliament elected Opposition Leader Enele Sopoaga to the premiership.

South America

Chile
1973 Chilean coup d'état: Accusing Salvador Allende's government of increasing authoritarianism, the Supreme Court, Comptroller General and Chamber of Deputies declared him out of order, and the Chamber urged the military to put an end to constitutional breaches. The military deposed Allende a few weeks later and abolished the constitution.

Peru
Peruvian Constitutional Crisis of 1992: President Alberto Fujimori, with the support of the armed forces, dissolved the Congress after it rejected his proposal for stronger action against Shining Path and MRTA. Then, he called for elections for a Democratic Constitutional Congress to write the 1993 Peruvian Constitution. Until the new constitution was written, he ruled by decree.

Venezuela
2017 Venezuelan constitutional crisis: The constitutional chamber of the Supreme Tribunal of Justice ruled that the country's legislature, the National Assembly, was operating in contempt of the constitution due to prior rulings that some members had been improperly elected, and assumed legislative power for itself. Politicians opposed to the government of President Nicolás Maduro, as well as Maduro's Prosecutor General, denounced the ruling for undermining the constitutional order, and the Tribunal rescinded it the following day. Maduro summoned a Constituent Assembly, nominally to draft a new constitution, but in practice to assert his authority against that of the National Assembly. As of 2021 the crisis remains unresolved, with National Assembly President Juan Guaidó claiming the presidency in opposition to Maduro.

See also

 Cabinet crisis

References

 
Constitutional law
Political crisis